Hyperion schroetteri is a species of beetles in the family Carabidae, the only species in the genus Hyperion. It is found in Australia and ranges from 2-7 centimetres in length.

References

Pterostichinae